Eureka College is a private college in Eureka, Illinois, that is related by covenant to the Christian Church (Disciples of Christ). Enrollment in 2018 was approximately 567 students.

Eureka College was the third college in the United States to admit men and women on an equal basis. It had a close connection with alumnus Ronald Reagan, the 40th president of the United States. In 2010, Eureka College was designated as a national historic district by the National Park Service.

History

The college was founded in 1848 by a group of abolitionists who had left Kentucky because of their opposition to slavery and was originally named the Walnut Grove Academy. It was chartered in 1855. When the school was founded, it was the first school in Illinois (and only the third in the United States) to educate women on an equal basis with men.
Abingdon College merged with Eureka in 1885.

Ronald Reagan
Eureka College is the smallest college or university in American history to graduate a future U.S. president with a bachelor's degree. Among its alumni throughout history are forty-two college and university presidents, seven governors and members of U.S. Congress, and the 40th president of the United States, Ronald Wilson Reagan, class of 1932.

Ronald Reagan is the only president born, raised and educated in the state of Illinois. Reagan's relationship with his alma mater began in 1928 when he entered as a freshman from Dixon, Illinois, at age 17.  Following his graduation on June 10, 1932, with a joint major in economics and sociology, Reagan returned for visits on twelve recorded occasions. He served on the board of trustees for three terms, stayed connected to his fraternity Tau Kappa Epsilon, communicated with his football coach and mentor Ralph "Mac" McKinzie, and helped support fund-raising drives including with his own financial commitments to the college. Reagan gave three commencement addresses at Eureka College in 1957, 1982 and 1992.  He dedicated the Melick Library building in 1967 and the Reagan Physical Education Center in 1970. When he died in 2004, Eureka College was one of three officially designated recipients of memorial gifts by his family.

In 1982, President Reagan told the  Eureka College audience, "Everything that has been good in my life began here."  He made similar statement at several other public speeches.

Eureka College has created programs related to Reagan, with a goal of enhancing the educational experience for its students:
 In 1982, Eureka College established the Ronald W. Reagan Leadership Program with President Reagan's blessing and assistance to provide scholarships, having awarded 128 four-year full tuition scholarships to designated Reagan Fellows.
 In 1994, Eureka College established a museum named after Reagan to hold and interpret many items which he donated to the college during his lifetime, under the leadership of founding curator Dr. Brian Sajko.
 In 2000, Eureka College dedicated the Reagan Peace Garden with a gift from central Illinois philanthropists Anne and David Vaughan to commemorate his important commencement speech at Eureka College in which Reagan called for nuclear arms reductions between the Soviet Union and the United States.
 In 2008, Eureka College's president, J. David Arnold, launched a new effort known as "Reagan Forward" to build on the Reagan legacy with the unanimous backing of the board of trustees.
 In 2008, Eureka College launched the Ronald W. Reagan Society to raise support for the college as a living legacy of Ronald Reagan and a national monument to American opportunity his story represents.
 On March 27, 2009, Eureka College hosted former leader of the Soviet Union Mikhail Gorbachev, the man of whom President Ronald Reagan famously demanded "Mr. Gorbachev, tear down this wall," in reference to the Berlin Wall that held citizens of East Berlin captive by threat of violence by the Communists.  President Gorbachev visited the section of the Berlin Wall on display in the Reagan Peace Garden on campus. President Arnold gave President Gorbachev an honorary degree during a convocation in which students asked the former Soviet leader questions.
 On March 31, 2009, Eureka College gave Nancy Reagan an honorary degree from her husband's alma mater at a private ceremony in the private quarters of the Ronald Reagan Presidential Library in Simi Valley, California.
 On November 9, 2009, Eureka College celebrated the 20th anniversary of the fall of the Berlin Wall with speaker General P.X. Kelley USMC (Ret.).
 Throughout 2010–11, Eureka College organized the Ronald Reagan Centennial Celebration whose honorary chairman was Governor Jim Edgar of Illinois.
 On May 14, 2011, Eureka College held its 150th commencement coinciding with the year-long Ronald Reagan Centennial Celebration, and former Speaker of the U.S. House of Representatives Newt Gingrich delivered the commencement address.
 January 13–15, 2011, Eureka College hosted an academic conference entitled "Reagan and the Midwest," designed to emphasize the study of the roots of Ronald Reagan. More than 15 scholars and authors attended including Martin Anderson and Annelise Anderson from the Hoover Institution at Stanford University, former United States Attorney General Edwin Meese III, journalist Fred Barnes, author Craig Shirley, author Peter Hannaford, and Midwest scholar Andrew Cayton.
 In 2011, Eureka College dedicated the Mark R. Shenkman Reagan Research Center and College Archives within the Melick Library on campus. Funded by its namesake, the center is collecting and maintaining every book and doctoral dissertation ever written about Ronald Reagan as a resource for scholars, students, and public.
 On March 28, 2012, Eureka College named James A. Baker III as an Honorary Reagan Fellow of Eureka College at a dinner ceremony hosted by the Ronald W. Reagan Society at the Union League Club of New York.
 In celebration of the 103rd anniversary of Ronald Reagan's birthday, February 6, 2013, Eureka College announced a $1 million gift from the estate of President Reagan's brother Neil Reagan (Eureka College Class of 1933) and sister-in-law Bess.
 On April 9, 2013, Justice Sandra Day O'Connor, the first woman to serve on the United States Supreme Court visited Eureka College where she was named an Honorary Reagan Fellow and gave a speech about her relationship with President Reagan.
 George P. Shultz, former U.S. Secretary of State, Treasury, Labor and Director of [OMB] was named Honorary Reagan Fellow at a Ronald W. Reagan Society ceremony in San Francisco on November 18, 2014.

Ronald Reagan Museum

The Ronald W. Reagan Museum, located within the Donald B. Cerf Center, contains a collection of objects and memorabilia largely donated by Reagan.  The items are from his times as a student, actor, athlete, Governor of California and President of the United States.  Admission is free.

Campus

 Burrus Dickinson Hall, Administration building, is on the National Register of Historic Places.
 The chapel is the building where Ronald Reagan gave his first public speech. It is also on the National Register of Historic Places.
 The Melick Library houses the Eureka College Archives. President Reagan gave a speech at its opening.
 Sanders Hall, a four-story, 17,000 square foot academic building, opened on campus in 2014. The building is worth $6.7M and includes pristine classrooms, labs, and a student lounge.
 The Reagan Athletic Complex (before 2015, known as the Reagan Physical Education Center or the Reagan Gym) was dedicated in 1970 by brothers Neil Reagan '33 and Ronald Reagan '32 and named in their honor.  The center houses the basketball court, weight rooms, and a state-of-the-art exercise center. In 1982, President Reagan announced the START treaty proposal in the Reagan Gym during the commencement address to the class of 1982. In 2015, The Bonati Fitness Center and Reagan Center Pool underwent renovation. These renovations included the rebuilding of the previously aged gym.

Student demographics
About 48% of the students at Eureka are women, while about 52% are men. 0.5% of the students are Native American, 0.35% are Asian, 8.5% are African-American, and 82% are white. 1.2% of the students are international, but 93.5% of the students are from the state of Illinois. The first-time, full-time bachelor's seeking student retention rate is 62% and the graduation rate cohort as percent of total entering students is 70%. The student-to-faculty ratio is 13 to 1.

Eureka also offers one four-year, full-tuition scholarship to a student interested in pursuing ministry in the Christian Church (Disciples of Christ). Ministry Fellows receive two on-site mentorships exploring ministry, minor in Philosophy and Religion, are expected to live on campus, maintain a 3.0 GPA, fully participate in ECMF activities, and display exceptional leadership, spiritual growth and maturity.

Athletics
The Eureka athletic teams are the Red Devils. The college is a member of the Division III level of the National Collegiate Athletic Association (NCAA), primarily competing in the St. Louis Intercollegiate Athletic Conference (SLIAC) since the 2006–07 academic year. The Red Devils previously competed in the defunct Northern Illinois-Iowa Conference from about 1996–97 to 2005–06; and in the Chicagoland Collegiate Athletic Conference (CCAC) of the National Association of Intercollegiate Athletics (NAIA) until after the 1995–96 school year. Eureka was also a member of the Illinois Intercollegiate Athletic Conference (IIAC) from 1910–11 to 1941–42.

Eureka competes in 14 intercollegiate varsity sports: Men's sports include baseball, basketball, cross country, football, golf, soccer and wrestling; while women's sports include basketball, cross country, golf, soccer, softball, volleyball and wrestling.

Football
On September 1, 2012, Eureka College quarterback Sam Durley set an NCAA record with 736 passing yards in Eureka's 62–55 victory over Knox College. That beat the old record of 731 yards set by a Menlo College quarterback in 2000.

Greek life
As of 2019, 23% of male students are in social fraternities, while 26% of female students are in social sororities. Overall 24% of the student body are involved in Greek Life. In February 2020, the college's chapter of Delta Sigma Phi was kicked off of campus due to unknown allegations.

Fraternities
 Tau Kappa Epsilon, Iota chapter
 Lambda Chi Alpha, Theta-Chi chapter
 Alpha Phi Omega, Alpha Eta Lambda chapter

Sororities
 Phi Omega, Alpha chapter - Local Sorority
 Delta Delta Pi, Alpha chapter - Local Sorority
 Delta Zeta, Pi chapter

Notable speakers and visitors
 1856: Abraham Lincoln
 1915: Booker T. Washington
 1927: Kirby Page
 1934: Norman Thomas
 1967: Everett M. Dirksen
 1988: Cornel West
 1992: Dan Quayle
 1994: Ray Bradbury
 1996: William F. Buckley, Jr
 2009: Mikhail Gorbachev
 2011: Newt Gingrich (commencement)
 2011: Edwin Meese III
 2011: Sarah Palin
 2013: Sandra Day O'Connor
 2015: Scott Walker
 2015: James W. Owens

Notable alumni

William A. Poynter, 1867, Nebraska politician and the tenth Governor of Nebraska
 James E. Harris, 1860's, eighth lieutenant governor of Nebraska from 1897-1899 
 Oliver Perry Hay, 1870, zoologist
 Frank Frantz, attended 1880s, Rough Rider and the final Governor of Oklahoma Territory
 Durward Sandifer, 1924, key person in writing the U.N. Declaration of Rights
 Dan C. Ogle, 1924, U.S. Air Force Surgeon General and Major General
 Harvey Butchart, 1928, explorer of Grand Canyon backcountry

 Ronald Reagan, 1932, actor, 33rd Governor of California  and 40th President of the United States
 Neil Reagan, 1933, radio, TV and advertising executive, brother of Ronald Reagan
 Franklin Burghardt, 1934, college football and basketball coach
 Emik Avakian, 1948, inventor and owner of numerous patents
 Tom Vaughn, about 1958, jazz pianist and Episcopal priest
 William L. White, 1969, addiction treatment and recovery researcher, author and historian
 Janelle Miller Reents, 1992, former president of Monical's Pizza

Honorary degree recipients
 Garfield Todd and Grace Todd, 1978
 Jerry Parr, 1987
 Nancy Reagan, 2009
 Mikhail Gorbachev, 2010

Notable faculty

Past
 Emma Smith DeVoe, Music, 1870–1871
 Oliver Perry Hay, Science
 Mary Frances Winston Newson, Mathematics
 Thomas O'Neal, football coach, 1915-1916
 George H. Pritchard, football coach, 1917-1919
 Ralph McKinzie, football coach, 1921–1937
 O. A. Hankner football coach, 1938
 Joseph Carl Hafele, mathematics
 John Dooley (American football), football coach, 1967-1968
 Ray Urban, football coach, 1969-1973
 Tom Hosier, football coach, 1974-1978
 Warner McCollum, football coach 1979-1989 and Athletic Director
 Cathy Compton, softball coach, 1987-1990
 Nicholas Fletcher, football coach, 1995-1999 
 Darrell Crouch, football coach, 2000-2004

Present
 Junius P. Rodriguez, historian

References

Bibliography
 Yager, Edward M., Ronald Reagan's Journey: Democrat to Republican, Rowman & Littlefield, 2006,

Further reading
 Harold Adams,  History of Eureka College, 1855-1982. Eureka, IL: Board of Trustees of Eureka College, 1982.
 Elmira J. Dickinson (ed.), A History of Eureka College: With Biographical Sketches and Reminiscences. St. Louis, MO: Christian Publishing Company, 1894.
 Jephthah Hobbs, About Eureka College. Garrettsville, OH: Peirce-Sherwood Printing Co. 1894.
 Eureka College, Eureka, Illinois, 1855-1955: A Community of Learning in Search of Truth, Human and Divine. Eureka, IL: Eureka College, [1955].
 On This Day in Eureka History 
 MODELS - "Matrons of Distinction": Eureka Leadership Series 
 VIBES - "Variations in Black" Eureka's Stories

External links

 Official website
 Official athletics website

 
Buildings and structures in Woodford County, Illinois
Education in Woodford County, Illinois
Educational institutions established in 1855
National Register of Historic Places in Woodford County, Illinois
Ronald Reagan Trail
Universities and colleges affiliated with the Christian Church (Disciples of Christ)
Tourist attractions in Woodford County, Illinois
University and college buildings on the National Register of Historic Places in Illinois
1855 establishments in Illinois
Private universities and colleges in Illinois